David Morton Steele (29 June 1894 – 23 May 1964) was a Scottish professional footballer and manager.

Playing career
Born in Carluke, Scotland, Steele was a wing half who started his football career as a part-timer first with Armadale then St Mirren while he worked as a miner before the First World War. After the war he moved to Scottish junior club Douglas Water Thistle.

In 1919, he joined then Southern League club Bristol Rovers playing for them during their first years in the league after they became members of the newly formed Division Three. Herbert Chapman signed Steele in a £2,500 deal to take him to Huddersfield Town in May 1922. Steele spent seven years at Huddersfield, winning a hat-trick of League Championships, two runners-up spot, an FA Cup runners-up medal in 1928, and three caps for Scotland. He joined Preston North End in May 1929 on a free transfer where he finished his playing days in July 1930.

Managerial career
Steele began his managerial career when he worked at Bury as a coach. Similar roles followed at Danish side Bold Klubben F.C. and Sheffield United.

In 1931 he spent some months in Aalborg in northern Denmark as a coach and introduced the WM-formation in Denmark.

In May 1936, he was appointed Bradford Park Avenue manager. He spent six years at Park Avenue and even turned out as an emergency centre forward against Sheffield Wednesday in October 1942 scoring one goal. He resigned in 1943 to rejoin Huddersfield Town. In the club's first post-war season, Huddersfield finished just one place above the relegation positions in Division One and Steele resigned.

He was working on the family's fruit farm when Bradford City tempted him back into football in July 1948. He became the second man, after Peter O'Rourke to manage both Bradford league clubs. He won just one of his first 18 games in charge as City finished bottom of Division Three (North) in 1948–49. The following season City came 19th, before a 7th-place finish in 1950–51. Steele left in February 1952 with the club again struggling in the bottom half of the league. He returned to Huddersfield Town for a third time as a scout. His grandson, David Shaw played for Town in the 1970s. He also ran a pub in Stanningley. He died in May 1964 aged 69.

Honours

Player
 Huddersfield Town
 Football League First Division winners: 1923–24, 1924–25, 1925–26
 runners-up: 1926–27, 1927–28
 FA Cup runners-up: 1927–28

References

External links

1894 births
1964 deaths
People from Carluke
Scottish footballers
Scotland international footballers
Scottish football managers
Scottish Junior Football Association players
Douglas Water Thistle F.C. players
Armadale F.C. players
Abercorn F.C. players
St Mirren F.C. players
Bristol Rovers F.C. players
Huddersfield Town A.F.C. players
Preston North End F.C. players
Bradford (Park Avenue) A.F.C. players
Association football wing halves
English Football League players
Bradford (Park Avenue) A.F.C. managers
Huddersfield Town A.F.C. managers
Bradford City A.F.C. managers
Footballers from South Lanarkshire
Place of death missing
FA Cup Final players